Gathurst Viaduct carries the M6 motorway across the Douglas valley at Shevington, Wigan, Greater Manchester.

The second largest bridge on the M6 motorway, it lies between junctions 26 and 27. Constructed in 6 spans, it crosses the Leeds-Liverpool Canal, the Manchester to Southport railway line and the River Douglas itself.

The reinforced concrete piers consist of five sets of four  diameter columns supporting a cill beam. In design terms it is a sister bridge of the Rakewood Viaduct on the M62 motorway near Littleborough. It was built primarily out of wrought iron.

It was built in 1961 by A. Monk and Co Ltd of Irlam at a cost of some £830,000. Steelwork was manufactured by Robert Watson Steelwork Ltd of Bolton.

References

Buildings and structures in the Metropolitan Borough of Wigan
Viaducts in England
Motorway bridges in England
Bridges in Greater Manchester
M6 motorway